CFI may refer to:

Organizations
 Campus Front of India, the student/campus wing of the Islamist organization, the Popular Front of India
 Canada Foundation for Innovation, an independent not-for-profit organization that invests in research facilities and equipment
 Carolina Film Institute, a film school
 Center for Inquiry, a US nonprofit organization that works to mitigate belief in pseudoscience and the paranormal
 Colorado Fuel and Iron, a large steel conglomerate
 Community Forests International, a charity that works with sustainability in forests
 Conservative Friends of Israel, a British parliamentary group dedicated to strengthening ties between the United Kingdom and Israel
 Consolidated Film Industries, a film laboratory and film processing company
 Contract Freighters, Inc., an American truckload freight carrier based in Joplin, Missouri
 Corporate Finance Institute, an online training and education platform
 Silicon Integration Initiative (previously CAD Framework Initiative), a non-profit consortium of semiconductor, systems, EDA, and manufacturing companies

Science and technology
 CFI, a human gene that encodes the protein complement factor I
 Common Flash Memory Interface, an open standard jointly developed by AMD, Intel, Sharp and Fujitsu
 Control-flow integrity, a general term for computer security techniques that prevent a wide variety of malware attacks
 Drop eligible indicator (previously Canonical Format Indicator), an element of the networking standard IEEE 802.1Q

Other uses
 Continuous-flow intersection, an alternative design for an at-grade road junction
 ISO 10962 (also CFI), a six-letter-code used to classify and describe the structure and function of a financial instrument
 CFI, referring to a certified flight instructor